Murjan (also Romanized as Mūrjān; also known as Marjān, Morghūn, Murghun, and Musghūn) is a village in Dadenjan Rural District, Meymand District, Firuzabad County, Fars Province, Iran. At the 2006 census, its population was 323, in 78 families.

References 

Populated places in Firuzabad County